II Tru is an American female rap duo composed of Cleveland natives Brina and Jhaz. They were discovered by fellow Cleveland group Bone Thugs-n-Harmony and subsequently joined the group's collective known as the Mo Thugs Family.

II Tru first appeared on Mo Thugs first album Family Scriptures, appearing on "Ghetto Bluez", "Welcome To My World" and "Family Scriptures". The album was a huge success, making it to No. 2 on the Billboard 200 and earning a platinum certification for sales of one million copies. Following the success of Family Scriptures, II Tru recorded and released their debut album, A New Breed of Female on September 9, 1997. The album, however, failed to match the success of Family Scriptures and quickly fell off the Billboard charts after peaking at 194 on the Billboard 200. II Tru's last appearance came on Mo Thugs' follow-up album, Chapter II: Family Reunion on the track entitled "Pimpin' Ain't Easy". After Chapter II, the duo left Mo Thugs and did not appear on Mo Thugs III: The Mothership or The Movement.

II Tru were working on a new independent album, aiming for a late 2014/early 2015 release, but it remains unreleased.

Discography

References

American hip hop groups
Women hip hop groups
American women rappers
African-American women rappers
Musical groups from Cleveland
Midwest hip hop groups
American musical duos
Hip hop duos